François de Salignac de la Mothe-Fénelon, more commonly known as François Fénelon (6 August 1651 – 7 January 1715), was a French Catholic archbishop, theologian, poet and writer. Today, he is remembered mostly as the author of The Adventures of Telemachus, first published in 1699.

Childhood and education, 1651–75

Fénelon was born on 6 August 1651 at the Château de Fénelon, in Sainte-Mondane, Périgord, Aquitaine, in the Dordogne river valley, the second of the three children of Pons de Salignac, Comte de La Mothe-Fénelon by his wife Louise de La Cropte. Reduced to the status of "impecunious old nobility" by François' time, the La Mothe-Fénelons had produced leaders in both Church and state. His uncle Francois currently served as bishop of nearby Sarlat, a see in which fifteen generations of the Fénelon family had filled the episcopal chair. "In fact, so many members of the family occupied the position that it had begun to be considered as practically a familial apanage to which the Salignac-Fénelon had a right as seigneurs of the locality" 

Fénelon's early education was provided in the Château de Fénelon by private tutors, who gave him a thorough grounding in the language and literature of the Greek and Latin classics.  In 1663, at age 12, he was sent to the University of Cahors, where he studied rhetoric and philosophy under the influence of the Jesuit ratio studiorum.  When the young man expressed interest in a career in the church, his uncle, the Marquis Antoine de Fénelon (a friend of Jean-Jacques Olier and Vincent de Paul) arranged for him to study at the Collège du Plessis in Paris, whose theology students followed the same curriculum as the theology students at the Sorbonne.  While there, he became friends with Antoine de Noailles, who later became a cardinal and the Archbishop of Paris.  Fénelon demonstrated so much talent at the Collège du Plessis that at age 15, he was asked to give a public sermon.

About 1672 (i.e. around the time he was 21 years old), Fénelon's uncle managed to get him enrolled in the Séminaire de Saint-Sulpice, the Sulpician seminary in Paris.

Early years as a priest, 1675–85
In about 1675, (when he would have been 24), Fénelon was ordained as a priest. He initially dreamed of becoming a missionary to the East, but instead, and at the instigation of friends, he preached in Sulpician parishes and performed routine pastoral work as his reputation for eloquence began to grow.

In early 1679, François Harlay de Champvallon, Archbishop of Paris, selected Fénelon as director of Nouvelles-Catholiques, a community in Paris for young Huguenot girls, who had been removed from their families and were about to join the Church of Rome. In 1681 he published a pedagogical work, Traité de l'éducation des filles (Treatise on the Education of Girls), which brought him much attention, not only in France, but abroad as well.

From 1681 to 1695, Fénelon was prior of the fortified monastery at Carennac.

Missionary to the Huguenots, 1686–87
During this period, Fénelon had become friends with his future rival Jacques-Bénigne Bossuet.  When Louis XIV revoked the Edict of Nantes in 1685, the Church began a campaign to send the greatest orators in the country into the regions of France with the highest concentration of Huguenots to persuade them of the errors of Protestantism.  Upon Bossuet's suggestion, Fénelon was included in this group, alongside such oratorical greats as Louis Bourdaloue and Esprit Fléchier.

He spent the next three years in the Saintonge region of France preaching to Protestants.  He persuaded the king to remove troops from the region and tried to avoid outright displays of religious oppression. But, in the end, he was willing to resort to force to make Protestants listen to his message.  He believed that "to be obliged to do good is always an advantage and that heretics and schismatics, when forced to apply their minds to the consideration of truth, eventually lay aside their erroneous beliefs, whereas they would never have examined these matters had not authority constrained them."

Important friends, 1687–89

During this period, Fénelon assisted Bossuet during his lectures on the Bible at Versailles. It was probably at Bossuet's urging that he now composed his Réfutation du système de Malebranche sur la nature et sur la grâce, a work in which he attacked Nicolas Malebranche's views on optimism, the creation, and the Incarnation. This work was not published until 1820, long after Fénelon's death.

Fénelon also became friendly with the Duc de Beauvilliers and the Duc de Chevreuse, who were married to the daughters of Louis XIV's minister of finance Jean-Baptiste Colbert. He wrote a Treatise on the Existence of God.

In 1688, Fénelon first met his cousin Jeanne Marie Bouvier de la Motte Guyon, usually known simply as Madame Guyon. At that time, she was well received in the social circle of the Beauvilliers and Chevreuses. Fénelon was deeply impressed by her piety and actively discipled her. He would later become a devotee and defend her brand of Quietism.

Royal tutor, 1689–97

In 1689, Louis XIV named Fénelon's friend the Duc de Beauvilliers as governor of the royal grandchildren. Upon Beauvilliers' recommendation, Fénelon was named the tutor of the Dauphin's eldest son, the seven-year-old Duke of Burgundy, who was second in line for the throne. This brought him a good deal of influence at court.

As tutor, Fénelon was charged with guiding the character formation of a future King of France. He wrote several important works specifically to guide his young charge. These include his Fables and his Dialogues des Morts.

But by far the most lasting of his works that Fénelon composed for the duke was his Les Aventures de Télémaque [The Adventures of Telemachus, Son of Ulysses], written in 1693–94.  On its surface, The Adventures of Telemachus was a novel about Ulysses' son Telemachus. On another level, it became a biting attack on the divine right absolute monarchy which was the dominant ideology of Louis XIV's France.  In sharp contrast to Bossuet, who, when tutor to the Dauphin, had written Politique tirée de l'Écriture sainte which affirmed the divine foundations of absolute monarchy while also exhorting the future king to use restraint and wisdom in exercising his absolute power, Fénelon went so far as to write "Good kings are rare and the generality of monarchs bad".

French literary historian Jean-Claude Bonnet calls Télémaque "the true key to the museum of the eighteenth-century imagination". One of the most popular works of the century, it became an immediate best seller both in France and abroad, going through many editions and translated into every European language and even Latin verse (first in Berlin in 1743, then in Paris by Étienne Viel [1737-87]). It inspired numerous imitations, such as the Abbé Jean Terrasson's novel Life of Sethos (1731), which in turn inspired Mozart's Magic Flute. It also more directly supplied the plot for Mozart's opera, Idomeneo (1781). Scenes from Télémaque appeared in wallpaper. The American president Andrew Jackson wallpapered the entrance hall to his slave plantation, The Hermitage, in Tennessee, with scenes from Telemachus on the Island of Calypso.

Most believed Fénelon's tutorship resulted in a dramatic improvement in the young duke's behaviour.  Even the memoirist Louis de Rouvroy, duc de Saint-Simon, who generally disliked Fénelon, admitted that when Fénelon became tutor, the duke was a spoiled, violent child; when Fénelon left him, the duke had learned the lessons of self-control as well as being thoroughly impressed with a sense of his future duties. Telemachus is therefore widely seen as the most thorough exposition of the brand of reformism in the Beauvilliers-Chevreuse circle, which hoped that following Louis XIV's death, his brand of autocracy could be replaced by a monarchy less centralized and less absolute, and with a greater role for aristocrats such as Beauvilliers and Chevreuse.

In 1693, Fénelon was elected to Seat 34 of the Académie française.

In 1694, the king named Fénelon Abbot of Saint-Valery, a lucrative post worth 14,000 livres a year.

The early- to mid-1690s are significant since it was during this period that Mme de Maintenon (quasi-morganatic wife of Louis XIV since roughly 1684) began to regularly consult Fénelon on matters of conscience.  Also, since Fénelon had a reputation as an expert on educating girls, she sought his advice on the house of Saint-Cyr which she was founding for girls.

In February 1696, the king nominated Fénelon to become the Archbishop of Cambrai while at the same time asking him to remain in his position as tutor to the duke of Burgundy. Fénelon accepted, and he was consecrated by his old friend Bossuet in August.

Quietist controversy, 1697–99

As already noted, Fénelon had met Madam Guyon in 1688 and became an admirer of her work.

In 1697, following a visit by Mme Guyon to Mme de Maintenon's school at Saint-Cyr, Paul Godet des Marais, Bishop of Chartres (Saint-Cyr was located within his diocese) expressed concerns about Mme Guyon's orthodoxy to Mme de Maintenon. The bishop noted that Mme Guyon's opinions bore striking similarities to Miguel de Molinos' Quietism, which Pope Innocent XI condemned in 1687. Mme de Maintenon responded by requesting an ecclesiastical commission to examine Mme Guyon's orthodoxy: the commission consisted of two of Fénelon's old friends, Bossuet and de Noailles, as well as the head of the Sulpician order of which Fénelon was a member.  The commission sat at Issy and, after six months of deliberations, delivered its opinion in the Articles d'Issy, 34 articles which briefly condemned certain of Mme Guyon's opinions, as well as set forth a brief exposition of the Catholic view of prayer. Both Fénelon and the Bishop of Chartres signed the articles, as did all three commission members.  Mme Guyon immediately submitted to the decision.

At Issy, the commission asked Bossuet to follow up the Articles with an exposition. Bossuet thus proceeded to write Instructions sur les états d'oraison, which he submitted to the commission members, as well as to the Bishop of Chartres and Fénelon, requesting their signatures before its publication. Fénelon refused to sign, arguing that Mme Guyon had already admitted her mistakes and there was no point in further condemning her.  Furthermore, Fénelon disagreed with Bossuet's interpretation of the Articles d'Issy, as he wrote in Explication des Maximes des Saints (a work often regarded as his masterpiece - English: Maxims of the Saints). Fénelon interpreted the Articles d'Issy in a way much more sympathetic to the Quietist viewpoint than Bossuet proposed.

Louis XIV responded to the controversy by chastising Bossuet for not warning him earlier of Fénelon's opinions and ordered Bossuet, de Noailles, and the Bishop of Chartres to respond to the Maximes des Saints. Shocked that his grandson's tutors held such views, the king removed Fénelon from his post as royal tutor and ordered Fénelon to remain within the boundaries of the archdiocese of Cambrai.

This unleashed two years of pamphlet warfare as the two sides traded opinions.  On 12 March 1699, the Inquisition formally condemned the Maximes des Saints, with Pope Innocent XII listing 23 specific propositions as unorthodox.

Fénelon immediately declared that he submitted to the pope's authority and set aside his own opinion.  With this, the Quietist matter was dropped.

However, that same year, The Adventures of Telemachus was published. This book also enraged Louis XIV, for it appeared to question his regime's very foundations. Thus, even after Fénelon abjured his Quietist views, the king refused to revoke his order forbidding Fénelon from leaving his archdiocese.

Later years

As Archbishop of Cambrai, Fénelon spent most of his time in the archiepiscopal palace, but also spent several months of each year visiting churches and other institutions within his archdiocese. He preached in his cathedral on festival days, and took an especial interest in seminary training and in examining candidates for the priesthood prior to their ordination.

During the War of the Spanish Succession, Spanish troops encamped in his archdiocese (an area France had only recently captured from Spain), but they never interfered with  the exercise of his archiepiscopal duties. Warfare, however, produced refugees, and  Fénelon opened his palace to refugees fleeing the ongoing conflict.

During these latter years, Fénelon wrote a series of anti-Jansenist works.  The impetus was the publication of the Cas de Conscience, which revived the old Jansenist distinction between questions of law and questions of fact, and argued that though the church had the right to condemn certain opinions as heretical, it did not have the right to oblige one to believe that these opinions were actually contained in Cornelius Jansen's Augustinus. The treatises, sermons, and pastoral letters Fénelon wrote in response occupy seven volumes in his collected works. Fénelon particularly condemned Pasquier Quesnel's Réflexions morales sur le Nouveau Testament. His writings contributed to the tide of scholarly opinion which led to Pope Clement XI's 1713 bull Unigenitus, condemning Quesnel's opinions.

Although confined to the Cambrai archdiocese in his later years, Fénelon continued to act as a spiritual director for Mme de Maintenon, as well as the ducs de Chevreuse and de Beauvilliers, the duke of Burgundy, and other prominent individuals.

Fénelon's later years were blighted by the deaths of many of his close friends.  Shortly before his death, he asked Louis XIV to replace him with a man opposed to Jansenism and loyal to the Sulpician order.  He died on 7 January 1715.

Fénelon as reformer and defender of human rights
Fénelon wrote about the dangers of power in government. Historian Paul Hazard remarks that the author posed hard questions for his fictional hero Telemachus to put to Idomeneus, King of Salente: 

Fénelon defended universal human rights, and the unity of humankind. He wrote:

He also wrote of women's education as a means against heresy.

Works
The Adventures of Telemachus, doi:10.3931/e-rara-79368 (Digitized Edition at E-rara).
 Treatise on the Education of Daughters
Dialogues of the dead
Lives of the ancient philosophers
Christian Perfection
 The Existence of God
Let Go
The Royal Way of the Cross
Maxims of the Mystics
The Inner Life
 Spiritual Letters (2 volumes, letters to men; letters to women, Rivingtons, London, 1877)

Biography
 H. L. Sidney Lear, Fenelon, Archbishop of Cambrai: A Biographical Sketch (London, 1877)
Stafford Harry Northcote, Viscount Saint Cyres, François de Fénelon (London: Methuen & Co., 1901)

See also
Human rights
Christian mysticism
 François de Salignac de la Mothe-Fénelon (missionary) - half brother and missionary

References

Further reading
"François de Salignac de la Mothe Fénelon." Encyclopedia of World Biography, 2nd ed. Gale Research, 1998.
Sabine Melchior-Bonnet, Fénelon. Paris; Éditions Perrin, 2008.
Peter Gorday, François Fénelon, a Biography: The Apostle of Pure Love. Brewster, MA; Paraclete Press, 2012.
Christoph Schmitt-Maaß, Stefanie Stockhorst and Doohwan Ahn (eds.). 'Fénelon in the Enlightenment: Traditions, Adaptations, and Variations'. Amsterdam - New York, Rodopi, 2014.

External links

 
 
 
 
  
Avis Chretiens "Christian Counsel" (1810) English translation
 Fenelon Librivox free audio
Catholic Encyclopedia article
"Educating Telemachus: Lessons in Fénelon's Underworld" by Ippokratis Kantzios

1651 births
1715 deaths
People from Dordogne
17th-century Roman Catholic archbishops in France
17th-century French novelists
17th-century French male writers
17th-century French Catholic theologians
17th-century Christian mystics
18th-century Roman Catholic archbishops in France
18th-century Christian mystics
Roman Catholic mystics
French poets
French religious writers
Members of the Académie Française
Archbishops of Cambrai
University of Paris alumni
French male poets
French male novelists
French male non-fiction writers